Pierre Reynaud (born 9 January 1968) is a French former professional footballer who played as a defender and midfielder. As of 2021, he is a scout for the Paris Saint-Germain Academy.

Club career 
Reynaud made 125 appearances for Paris Saint-Germain, the club at which he stayed from 1986 to 1994. He joined Toulouse for the final three years of his career.

International career 
Reynaud made one appearance for the France B team in his career.

Post-playing career 
Reynaud became a scout for the Paris Saint-Germain Academy in 2005.

Following a controversy about the racial profiling of scouted players from 2013 to 2018, Reynaud was fined €5,000 by the LFP.

Honours 
Paris Saint-Germain

 Division 1: 1993–94
 Coupe de France: 1992–93

References

1968 births
Living people
People from Houilles
French footballers
Association football midfielders
Association football defenders
Paris Saint-Germain F.C. players
Toulouse FC players

External links 

 
Ligue 1 players
Ligue 2 players
France B international footballers
Association football scouts
Paris Saint-Germain F.C. non-playing staff